Telling Stories may refer to:

 Telling Stories (album), an album by Tracy Chapman
 Telling Stories (book), an autobiography by Tim Burgess of the Charlatans
 Tellin' Stories, an album by the Charlatans
 Telling Stories with Tomie dePaola, a children's TV series made by the Jim Henson Company

See also
 Storytelling (disambiguation)